For the Archdiocese in California, USA, please see Roman Catholic Archdiocese of San Francisco

The Roman Catholic Diocese of San Francisco is in Argentina and is a suffragan of the Archdiocese of Córdoba.

History
On 10 April 1961 Blessed John XXIII established the Diocese of San Francisco from the Archdiocese of Córdoba.

Ordinaries
Pedro Reginaldo Lira † (1961–1965)
Agustín Adolfo Herrera † (1965–1988)
Baldomero Carlos Martini (1988–2004) Appointed Bishop of San Justo
Carlos José Tissera (2004–2011) Appointed Bishop of Quilmes
Sergio Osvaldo Buenanueva (2013–present)

References

Roman Catholic dioceses in Argentina
Roman Catholic Ecclesiastical Province of Córdoba
Christian organizations established in 1961
Roman Catholic dioceses and prelatures established in the 20th century
1961 establishments in Argentina